{{Infobox radio station
| name             = WAFJ and WBFJ
| logo             = WAFJ station logo.png
| city             = WAFJ: Belvedere, South CarolinaWBFJ: Saluda, South Carolina
| area             = Augusta metropolitan area
| branding         = "88.3 WAFJ"
| erp              = WAFJ: 4,500 wattsWBFJ: 130 watts horizontal polarization and 51,000 watts vertical polarization
| haat             = WAFJ: 423 meters (1388 ft)WBFJ: 120 meters (394 ft)
| airdate          = 1994
| frequency        = WAFJ: 88.3 MHzWBIJ: 88.7 MHz
| format           = Christian Contemporary
| class            = WAFJ: C2WBIJ: C1
| callsign_meaning = Winning Augusta for Jesus| owner            = Radio Training Network
| website          = WAFJ.com
}}WAFJ (88.3 MHz) and WBIJ''' (88.7 MHz) are non-commercial FM radio stations serving the Augusta metropolitan area,  owned by Radio Training Network (RTN).  88.3 WAFJ is licensed to Belvedere, South Carolina and plays contemporary Christian music. WBIJ, 88.7 The Song, is licensed to Saluda, South Carolina and plays modern worship music. The radio studios and offices are on LeCompte Avenue in North Augusta, South Carolina.

The stations are listener supported and depends on contributions for operating funding.

Translators
In addition to WAFJ and WBIJ, the stations utilize FM translators to get in to smaller towns across Georgia.

See also

Media in Augusta, Georgia

References

External links
 WAFJ — official website

AFJ
Radio stations established in 1994
1994 establishments in South Carolina